Clanoneurum americanum is a species of shore flies in the family Ephydridae.

Distribution
United States,

References

Ephydridae
Insects described in 1940
Taxa named by Ezra Townsend Cresson
Diptera of North America